Brenden David Nelson Bissett (born January 28, 1993) is a Canadian field hockey player who plays as a midfielder or forward for the Vancouver Hawks and the Canadian national team.

Club career
Since 2017, he played club hockey in the Netherlands for NMHC Nijmegen. After one season he returned to Canada to the Vancouver Hawks.

International career
He competed at the 2015 Pan American Games and won a silver medal. In 2016, he was named to Canada's Olympic team. He was selected for the 2018 World Cup, where he played all four games. In June 2019, he was selected in the Canada squad for the 2019 Pan American Games. They won the silver medal as they lost 5–2 to Argentina in the final.

In June 2021, Bissett was named to Canada's 2020 Summer Olympics team.

References

External links
 
 Brenden Bissett at Field Hockey Canada
 
 
 
 

1993 births
Living people
Field hockey players from Vancouver
Canadian male field hockey players
Male field hockey midfielders
Male field hockey forwards
Field hockey players at the 2015 Pan American Games
Field hockey players at the 2016 Summer Olympics
Field hockey players at the 2020 Summer Olympics
Field hockey players at the 2018 Commonwealth Games
2018 Men's Hockey World Cup players
Field hockey players at the 2019 Pan American Games
Pan American Games silver medalists for Canada
Olympic field hockey players of Canada
Pan American Games medalists in field hockey
NMHC Nijmegen players
Expatriate field hockey players
Canadian expatriate sportspeople in the Netherlands
Medalists at the 2015 Pan American Games
Medalists at the 2019 Pan American Games
Commonwealth Games competitors for Canada